Francisc Zimmermann (born 1900, date of death unknown) was a Romanian footballer. He competed in the men's tournament at the 1924 Summer Olympics.

References

External links

1900 births
Year of death missing
Romanian footballers
Romania international footballers
Olympic footballers of Romania
Footballers at the 1924 Summer Olympics
Place of birth missing
Association football midfielders
CA Timișoara players